Forst Hilti, also known as Schaan Forst Hilti, is one of four railway stations serving Liechtenstein. It is located in front of the Hilti Corporation's headquarters, on the outskirts of Schaan. The station is served by eighteen trains per day, nine in each direction between Switzerland and Austria.

See also
Schaan-Vaduz railway station
Nendeln railway station
Schaanwald railway station
Rail transport in Liechtenstein
Railway stations in Liechtenstein

References

External links

Railway stations in Liechtenstein
Schaan Forst Hilty railway station